Sanatkumara Chakravarti is the 4th Chakravarti of present Avasarpiṇī (present time cycle) of the Jain cosmology.

His parents were Asvasena, the king of Hastinapur and queen Sahadevi. He took education in science and arts. Prince Mahendrasimha was his close friend, who also helped him get back to his kingdom after he was once lost. The legend notes that Sanatkumara was once riding a horse that was not trained well and lost his track and reached Manasa lake wherein he faced various troubles and fought and won battles. He married many women and eventually was made king of Vidyadharas. Mahendrasimha then found Sanatkumara and brought him back to Hastinapur. After his father Asvasena renounced his kingdom to become a monk, Sanatkumara took over and became Chakravartin.

Sanatkumara, in his times, was also popular for his beauty that even the god Indra once praised in his court. Two gods hence descended on earth to look for themselves how handsome Sanatkumara was. While Sanatkumara had just finished practicing wrestling, he was about to bathe and get ready. The gods were awestruck by his beauty and admired it. When Sanatkumara realized that gods had arrived to adore him, with pride he asked them to wait in the court till he bathes and dresses up in all his royal attire and ornaments, post which they could appreciate his beauty more. However, when Sanatkumara reached his court, the gods had changed their mind upon second meeting. Surprised to see the change, Sanatkumara questioned them and received the answer that his body was mortal and all wealth and health would one day vanish. He realized how false his pride about his beauty was and he ordained to be a monk and went for tapa to attain knowledge. Post long penance, he was placed in the heaven as a god.  

Poet Srichandra from the town of Chandragachchha wrote an epic of Sanatkumara's life in 1157 AD consisting of 8127 verses. The story includes his romantic life and various supernatural events.

References 

Jain monarchs